Ch. Shafiq Ahmad Gujjar is a Pakistani politician who had been a member of the Provincial Assembly of the Punjab from August 2018 till January 2023.

Political career

He started his political career from local bodies politics and was elected Nazim Union Council. He was elected to Provincial Assembly of the Punjab as candidate of PML(N) from PP-68 Faisalabad in 2008 Pakistani general election. He was re-elected to the Provincial Assembly of the Punjab as a candidate of Pakistan Muslim League (N) from Constituency PP-107 (Faisalabad-XI in 2018 Pakistani general election for second term.

References

Living people
Pakistan Muslim League (N) MPAs (Punjab)
Year of birth missing (living people)